Bucephalandra ultramafica is a species of flowering plant in the family Araceae, native to Sabah on Borneo. It is found growing on ultramafic rocks alongside rivers.

References

Aroideae
Endemic flora of Borneo
Plants described in 2014